German submarine U-446 was a Type VIIC U-boat of Nazi Germany's Kriegsmarine during World War II.

She carried out no patrols. She did not sink or damage any ships.

She was sunk on 21 September 1942 by a mine. She was raised on 1 November 1942 and scuttled on 3 May 1945. She was broken up in 1947.

Design
German Type VIIC submarines were preceded by the shorter Type VIIB submarines. U-446 had a displacement of  when at the surface and  while submerged. She had two shafts and two  propellers.

U-446 was fitted with five  torpedo tubes (four fitted at the bow and one at the stern), fourteen torpedoes, one  SK C/35 naval gun, 220 rounds, and a  C/30 anti-aircraft gun. The boat had a complement of between forty-four and sixty.

Service history
The submarine was laid down on 9 April 1941 at F Schichau in Danzig (now Gdansk), as yard number 1506, launched on 11 April 1942 and commissioned on 20 June under Oberleutnant zur See Hellmuth-Bert Richard.

She served with the 8th U-boat Flotilla from 20 June 1942 until 21 September.

Fate
The submarine was sunk on 21 September 1942 by a mine near Kahlberg (now Krynica Morska in Poland) in the Gulf of Danzig. She was raised on 1 November and scuttled near Kiel on 3 May 1945. She was broken up in 1947.

Twenty-three men died in the mine sinking; there were eighteen survivors.

References

Bibliography

#

External links

German Type VIIC submarines
U-boats commissioned in 1942
U-boats sunk by mines
1942 ships
Ships built in Danzig
World War II submarines of Germany
Maritime incidents in September 1942
Maritime incidents in May 1945
U-boats sunk in 1945
Ships built by Schichau